Finanstilsynet may refer to:

 Financial Supervisory Authority (Denmark)
 Financial Supervisory Authority of Norway